Russell Mwafulirwa (born 24 February 1983, in Zomba) is a Malawian former football player who played for Ajax Cape Town and IFK Norrköping. In 2020 went to Sweden for coaching courses.

Career
Mwafulirwa began his career with Silver Strikers in Malawi. In 2002, he signed for South African Premier Soccer League club Jomo Cosmos. After almost four years with Jomo Cosmos, he joined Ajax Cape Town in January 2006. In June 2008, he transferred to Swedish team IFK Norrköping.

International career
He was part of the Malawi national football team at the 2010 Africa Cup of Nations scoring two goals in the group stage against Algeria and Mali.

References

External links

1983 births
Living people
People from Zomba District
Malawian footballers
Malawi international footballers
2010 Africa Cup of Nations players
South African Premier Division players
Allsvenskan players
Cape Town Spurs F.C. players
Jomo Cosmos F.C. players
IFK Norrköping players
Association football forwards
Silver Strikers FC players
Expatriate footballers in Sweden
Expatriate soccer players in South Africa
Malawian expatriate footballers
Malawian expatriate sportspeople in South Africa

Nyasa Big Bullets FC players
IK Sleipner players